Petro Mikhailovich Talanchuk (born July 1, 1939, Gorodishche-Kosovskoe, Kyiv region) is a Ukrainian political and public figure. He holds a Doctor of Technical Sciences. He was rector of the Kyiv Polytechnic Institute (1987 to 1992) and the First Minister of Education of Ukraine (1992 to 1994).

References

External links
 Біографія П. М. Таланчука // Хто є хто на Київщині. Видатні земляки 2006

1939 births
Education and science ministers of Ukraine
Recipients of the Order of Friendship of Peoples
Candidates in the 1994 Ukrainian presidential election